Toronto, Ontario, is home to several professional, semi-professional, and university sports teams. It is notable among Canadian cities in sports for having several professional and semi-professional teams associated with United States leagues.

Professional teams
 Scarborough Shooting Stars (Canadian Elite Basketball League) (est. 2022)
 Toronto Argonauts (Canadian Football League) (est. 1873)
 Toronto Arrows (Major League Rugby) (est. 2019)
 Toronto Blue Jays (Major League Baseball) (est. 1977)
 Toronto FC (Major League Soccer) (est. 2006)
 Toronto FC II (MLS Next Pro soccer) (est. 2015) 
 Toronto Maple Leafs (National Hockey League) (est. 1917, current name since 1927)
 Toronto Marlies  (American Hockey League) (est. 1978, in Toronto since 2005)
 Toronto Nationals (Global T20 Canada cricket) (est. 2018)
 Toronto Raptors (National Basketball Association) (est. 1995)
 Toronto Six (National Women's Hockey League) (est. 2020)
 York United FC (Canadian Premier League soccer) (est. 2019)

Semi-professional teams
 Alliance United FC (League 1 Ontario) (est. 2018)
 Master's Futbol (League 1 Ontario) (est. 2014)
 North Toronto Nitros (League 1 Ontario) (est. 2016)
 Ontario Blues (Canadian Rugby Championship) (est. 2009)
 Toronto Beaches (OLA Junior A Lacrosse League) (est. 1991)
 Toronto City Saints (Ontario Rugby League) (est. 2010)
 TFC Academy - (MLS Next) (est. 2008)
 Toronto Maple Leafs (Intercounty Baseball League) (est. 1969)
 Toronto Raiders - (Major League Quadball) (est. 2019)
 Toronto Rebellion (Rugby Canada National Junior Championship) (est. 1999)
 Toronto Rush (American Ultimate Disc League) (est. 2013)

Canadian Soccer League
 FC Ukraine United (est. 2006)
 FC Vorkuta (est. 2008)
 Scarborough SC (est. 2014)
 Serbian White Eagles (est. 1968)

Ontario Australian Football League
 Broadview Hawks
 Central Blues
 Etobicoke Kangaroos
 High Park Demons
 Toronto Downtown Dingos
 Toronto Eagles
 Toronto Rebels

Professional eSports teams
 Raptors Uprising GC (NBA 2K League) (est. 2018)
 Toronto Defiant (Overwatch League) (est. 2018)
 Toronto Ultra (Call of Duty League) (est. 2019)

Amateur teams

Universities
 TMU Bold (Toronto Metropolitan University) (est. 1948)
 Varsity Blues (University of Toronto) (est. 1877)
 York Lions (York University) (est. 1968)

Colleges
 Seneca Sting
 Humber Hawks
 George Brown Huskies
 Centennial Colts

Junior
 Toronto Predators
 Toronto Jr. Canadiens
 Toronto Patriots
 St. Michael's Buzzers
 North York Rangers

Other
Handball Club Toronto

Defunct teams

Ice hockey 
 Toronto 228th Battalion - National Hockey Association (1916–17)
 Toronto Aeros - National Women's Hockey League (1998–2006; became the Mississauga Aeros for 2006–07)
 Toronto Attack - Greater Metro Junior A Hockey League (2012–17)
 Toronto Blueshirts - National Hockey Association (1911–17)
 Toronto Furies (Canadian Women's Hockey League) (2010-2018)
 Toronto Marlboros - Ontario Hockey League (1904–89)
 Toronto Ontarios - National Hockey Association (1913–14)
 Toronto Roadrunners - American Hockey League (2003–04)
 Toronto Shamrocks - National Hockey Association (1915)
 Toronto St. Michael's Majors - Ontario Hockey League (1906–62, 1996–2007)
 Toronto Tecumsehs - National Hockey Association (1912–13)
 Toronto Toros - World Hockey Association (1973–76)

Soccer 
 North York Astros  - Canadian Soccer League (1990–14)
 SC Toronto - Canadian Soccer League (2001–12)
 Toronto Blizzard - North American Soccer League (1971–84; known as the Toronto Metros (1971–74) and Toronto Metros-Croatia (1975-78))
 Toronto Blizzard - Canadian National Soccer League (1985–86), Canadian Soccer League (1987–92), American Professional Soccer League (1993)
 Toronto City - Eastern Canada Professional Soccer League (1961–65), United Soccer Association (1967)
 Toronto Falcons - National Professional Soccer League (1967), North American Soccer League (1968)
 Toronto Greenbacks - North American Soccer Football League (1946–47)
 Toronto Lynx (USL Premier Development League; previously in the A-League (1997-2004) and USL First Division (2005–06))
 Toronto Lady Lynx (USL Women's soccer) (2005-2011)
 Toronto Rockets - American Professional Soccer League (1994)
 Toronto Shooting Stars - National Professional Soccer League (1996–97)
 Toronto ThunderHawks - National Professional Soccer League (2000–01)

Lacrosse 

 Toronto Maple Leafs - International Lacrosse League (1932)
 Toronto Maple Leafs - National Lacrosse Association (1968)
 Toronto Nationals - Major League Lacrosse (2009–10)
 Toronto Shooting Stars - National Lacrosse League (1972-4)
 Toronto Shooting Stars - Canadian Lacrosse League (2012–13)
 Toronto Tecumsehs - International Lacrosse League (1931–32)
 Toronto Tomahawks - National Lacrosse League (1974)

Other 

 Balmy Beach Saints - O.A.F.L. (1992–97)
 Toronto Balmy Beach Beachers - Ontario Rugby Football Union (1924–57)
 Toronto Huskies - Basketball Association of America (1946–47)
 Toronto Maple Leafs - International League (1896-1967)
 Toronto Northmen - World Football League (scheduled to join in 1974 but never played a game)
 Toronto Phantoms - Arena Football League (2001–02)
 Toronto Planets - Roller Hockey International (1993)
 Toronto Rebellion - Rugby Canada National Junior Championship (2009)
 Toronto Rifles - Continental Football League (1965–67)
 Toronto Titans (International Swimming League) (2020-21)
 Toronto Tornados - Continental Basketball Association (1983–85)
 Toronto Torpedoes - Major League Roller Hockey (1998)
 Toronto Triumph - Legends Football League (2011–12)
 Toronto Wolfpack - Rugby Football League (2016-2020; will resume operations in 2022 with the North American Rugby League)
 Toronto Xtreme - Rugby Canada Super League (1999-2007; known as Toronto Renegades (1999-2002))
 Toronto-Buffalo Royals – World Team Tennis (1974)

See also
 Sports in Toronto
 Amateur sport in Toronto
 CJCL (AM) (Toronto's all-sports radio station, The FAN 590)
 CHUM (AM) (Toronto all-sports radio station, TSN Radio 1050)

References

 
Toronto
Sports teams
Toronto